Sybra javana is a species of beetle in the family Cerambycidae. It was described by Breuning in 1939. It is known from Borneo and Java.

References

javana
Beetles described in 1939